Hopes and Fears is the debut studio album by the English alternative rock band Keane. It was released on 10 May 2004 in the United Kingdom and topped the UK Albums Chart upon release. It was the UK's second best-selling album of 2004, behind the Scissor Sisters' self-titled debut album, and has since been certified 9× Platinum by the BPI. The album returned to the top of the charts after winning a Brit Award for Best Album in February 2005.

With more than 2.7 million copies sold in the UK, Hopes and Fears ranks the 11th-best-selling album of the 2000s in the UK. In July 2011, it was ranked the 9th biggest-selling album of the 21st century in the UK. As of September 2019 it is the 36th best-selling album in UK chart history. Worldwide, the album has sold over 5.8 million copies . It was also among ten albums nominated for the best British album of the previous 30 years by the Brit Awards in 2010, ultimately losing to (What's the Story) Morning Glory? by Oasis.

Album information
Unlike their follow-up album, most songs were already composed by the album's conception date; the track "She Has No Time" was composed circa 1999, making it the earliest composed song appearing on the album. Some were already played in a guitar-led form with Dominic Scott still in the band. "Bedshaped", "She Has No Time", and "This Is The Last Time" were played at some of the last gigs with Scott. The tracks "On a Day Like Today" and "We Might As Well Be Strangers" became the last to be composed, circa 2003.

The album was recorded at Helioscentric Studios in Peasmarsh, Rye by Andy Green and the band between September and Christmas 2003.  James Sanger did not attend any recording sessions post his involvement with the band in 2001.

The album was mixed down to six channels to enable a release on Super Audio CD (SACD).

The album takes its name from the lyrics of the song "Snowed Under", released as a B-side on the single for "Somewhere Only We Know". The relevant section of the lyrics reads: "You've been looking everywhere for someone to understand your hopes and fears."

Hal Leonard music published two versions of the official score book for Hopes and Fears, designed for differing skill levels. The Music Sales Group also published a book, including two demo CDs with accompanying bass and drum tracks, along with scores for the B-side songs "Snowed Under", "Walnut Tree", and "Fly to Me".

Singles

Critical reception

Hopes and Fears received generally positive reviews from critics. Review-aggregating website Metacritic, reported a normalised score of 61/100, based on 18 reviews, indicating "generally favourable" reviews. 

Playlouder was very positive, calling it "one of the best albums you'll hear this year", as was Q magazine, which gave it four out of five stars and wrote that "as a debut album, its confidence is right up there with [Oasis's] Definitely Maybe." AllMusic, giving the album four and a half out of five stars, praised its "beautiful, emotive dalliance of instrumentation", singer Tom Chaplin's "rich vocals", and the band's "open-hearted ambition...audible on every song", while Rolling Stone noted that the album "contains more hooks than most pop groups manage in their careers."

In a mixed three-star review, The Guardian criticised the first half the album for "rely[ing] too heavily on Chaplin's show-stopping vocals" and for the "radio-friendly simplicity of the lyrics", while praising "Can't Stop Now" as a "swooning, epic pop song" and the "booming drum and bass" of "Untitled 1" on the second half. Drowned in Sound gave it 5 out of 10, accusing Keane of excessively imitating Coldplay (specifically comparing "Your Eyes Open" and "On a Day Like Today" to, respectively, "Daylight" and "Politik" on the band's album A Rush of Blood to the Head), criticising the album as being "stylistically all over the place" and its lyrics as being "immature" and "cringe-worthy". However, it gave credit to the album's "fine moments", praising lead single "Somewhere Only We Know", for example, as "breathtaking".

Legacy
In 2006, British Hit Singles & Albums and NME organised a poll in which 40,000 people worldwide voted for the 100 best albums ever, and Hopes and Fears was placed at #51 on the list. The album was ranked #5 in Amazon's Best Selling Albums of the Decade. In 2005, the album won the Brit Award for best album. In 2010 the album was nominated for Brit awards in the category Album of 30 Years; however, it lost to Oasis's (What's the Story) Morning Glory?

In 2011, Q magazine made a list called 250 Best Albums of Q's Lifetime 1986–2010 and the album appeared at number 34.

Track listing

Deluxe edition
Issued in 2009. The first CD includes the original track list, as seen above, plus tracks 13–19. The second CD presents B-sides, early singles, and other rare tracks.

Personnel

Keane
Tom Chaplin – lead vocals
Tim Rice-Oxley – piano, keyboards, bass, backing vocals, co-lead vocals on "Sunshine"
Richard Hughes – drums

Additional personnel
Andy Green – programming and production
Mark "Spike" Stent – mixing

Charts

Weekly charts

Year-end charts

Certifications

Bonus DVD

A CD+DVD version was released internationally over the course of 2005. This version included two bonus tracks, "Snowed Under" and a remix dance version of "We Might as Well Be Strangers" by DJ Shadow. The DVD contained the four international videos for "Somewhere Only We Know", "Everybody's Changing", "Bedshaped", and "This is the Last Time", and the US video for "Somewhere Only We Know".

This version of Hopes and Fears also featured a different box cover design: white and with Keane's "Everybody's Changing" promotional image. The inner 2-CD box had the same cover as the international version.

Track listing
"Somewhere Only We Know" (international version video)
"Somewhere Only We Know" (US version video)
"Everybody's Changing" (version 1 video)
"Bedshaped" (video)
"This Is the Last Time" (version 4 video)

Japanese version
Keane 30-second TV advertisement
"Somewhere Only We Know" (live)
"She Has No Time" (live)
"This Is the Last Time" (live)
"We Might As Well Be Strangers" (live)
"Everybody's Changing" (live)
"Bedshaped" (live)
"Somewhere Only We Know" (international version video)

References

External links
 Official album site
 Hopes and Fears on Keaneshaped

2004 debut albums
Island Records albums
Brit Award for British Album of the Year
Keane (band) albums
Keane (band) video albums